Colebrook Iron Master's House, also known as the Colebrook Mansion and Colebrook Estate, is a historic home located at South Londonderry Township, Lebanon County, Pennsylvania. It was built between about 1791 and 1796, and is a -story, 3-bay wide by 2-bay brownstone residence in a vernacular Georgian style.  Also on the property are a contributing spring house, kitchen house, stable, privy, carriage shed, spring trough, and an 18th-century iron fence.

It was added to the National Register of Historic Places in 2010.

References

Houses on the National Register of Historic Places in Pennsylvania
Georgian architecture in Pennsylvania
Houses completed in 1796
Houses in Lebanon County, Pennsylvania
National Register of Historic Places in Lebanon County, Pennsylvania
1796 establishments in Pennsylvania